Killamarsh is a civil parish in the North East Derbyshire district of Derbyshire, England.  The parish contains five listed buildings that are recorded in the National Heritage List for England.  Of these, one is listed at Grade II*, the middle of the three grades, and the others are at Grade II, the lowest grade.  The parish contains the town of Killamarsh and the surrounding area.  All the listed buildings are in the town, and consist of a church and a cross in the churchyard, and a farmhouse and associated farm buildings.


Key

Buildings

References

Citations

Sources

 

Lists of listed buildings in Derbyshire